The Housing and Development Bank is an Egyptian bank established in Cairo on June 30, 1979, originally as a state owned enterprise (SOE), with a mandate to alleviate housing shortages by narrowing the gap between the low supply and increasing demand. The bank has since been traded on the Egyptian Stock Exchange (EGX) and has the Reuters code HDBK.CA The bank is a joint-stock company, where at the end of 2021 Egyptian SOEs owned the majority of shares ( 29.81% New Urban Communities Authority, 5.03% Ministry of Awqaf, 8.92% Misr Life Insurance, 8.29% by Misr Insurance, and 7.41% by the Housing Projects Fund) in addition to significant holdings by Saudi Arabian businessmen Abdelmoniem al-Rashed and Ali Dayekh through their Dubai based companies Rolaco EGB Investment LLC 10.00% and Rimco EGT Investment LLC 9.80% respectively. At the end of 2022 HDBK had a market capitalization of £E9.2 billion.

Subsidiaries
 Holding Company for Investment and Development (92.00%) 
 Development and Housing Company for Real Estate Investment (60.00%) 
 HD Financial Leasing (60.00%) 
 Digital Transformation Systems Co (40.00%) 
 Hemaya Security and Money Transfer Co (40.00%) 
 El Taameer for projects and Environmental Public Services (39.00%) 
 El Tameer Company for Financial and Real Estate Marketing (39.00%) 
 El Tameer Company for Real Estate Investment and Development (37.00%) 
 Hyde Park Properties for Development (36.90%) 
 Development and Housing Company for Utilities SAE (35.00%) 
 City Edge (33.40%) 
 Misr Sinai Tours Co (30.00%) 
 Obelisk Portfolio Management and Investment Funds (30.00%) 
 Taamir Mortgage Co (24.84%) 
 Al Tameer Company for Real Estate Management (15.70%) 
 HD Trading Securities (10.80%) 
 El Taamir Securitization (NA)

See also
 List of banks in Egypt

References

Egyptian brands
Banks of Egypt
Government-owned companies of Egypt
1979 establishments in Egypt
Companies listed on the Egyptian Exchange
Government-owned banks